Firsov is a lunar impact crater on the far side of the Moon. It is located to due south of the crater Lobachevskiy, and to the northwest of Abul Wáfa. The circular rim of this crater has a small outward bulge along the southern edge, and smaller bulges along the western side. The inner walls have slumped to form talus piles along the base. The low-albedo interior floor is nearly level and featureless.

Just east of Firsov, within an unnamed, flat-floored crater is an unusual swirl pattern of high albedo, similar to the floor of Mare Marginis and to the Reiner Gamma feature.

Views

Satellite craters
By convention, these features are identified on lunar maps by placing the letter on the side of the crater midpoint that is closest to Firsov.

References

 
 
 
 
 
 
 
 
 
 
 
 

Impact craters on the Moon